The seizure of Donetsk by separatists took place during April 2014 in an early phase of the war in Donbass. As a result, Donetsk came under the control of the Donetsk People's Republic and became its capital. As well as numerous sabotage acts, the city suffered significant destruction, and a large number of residents were forced to leave the city.

DNR 
The separatist movement in Donetsk region has been known since 2005, when after Viktor Yushchenko came to power an organization "Donetsk Republic" appeared in Donetsk. It set the goal of creating "Donetsk Federal Republic", and began to openly collect signatures for holding a referendum.  Despite the ban, the organization did not stop illegal activities, conducting jointly with the Communist Party and other pro-Russian movements separatist actions with logistical assistance of the Communist Party of Ukraine (tents for actions, printing and distribution of leaflets, etc.).

March 2014 
The rapid intensification of the separatist movement in Donetsk began after the victory of the Revolution of Dignity and the escape of Viktor Yanukovych abroad. On March 1, 2014, about 10,000–15,000 people gathered for a rally demanding the support of berkut fighters who killed demonstrators in Kyiv. The participants of the rally expressed distrust to the head of the Donetsk regional state administration Andrei Shishatsky and announced the commander of the People's Defense of Donbas Pavlo Gubarev as their leader.  On the same day, the Donetsk City Council initiated a referendum on the status of the Donetsk region. On the same day, the initiative of the city council was supported by the Donetsk Regional Council.

At about 12 o'clock, supporters of Pavel Gubarev were joined by activists of the separatist organization "Donetsk Republic", who, under anti-Ukrainian slogans, demanded the voluntary resignation of Andrei Shishatsky, and then moved to storm the building  the regional state administration. The aggressive actions of the supporters of the partition of Ukraine deterred about two dozen soldiers of the Special Forces "Griffon", who retreated under pressure. Under the walls of the Regional State Administration, demonstrators demanded to hold a referendum on the separation of Donbas from Ukraine. The participants of the assault lowered the flag of Ukraine from the flagpole, replacing it with a Russian flag; flag of Donetsk region on another flagpole protesters did not change.

In the evening, the Donetsk City Council, fearing the pressure of pro-Russian forces, convened an extraordinary session, which unanimously decided to hold a referendum on the further stay of the region as a part of Ukraine. In addition, city deputies decided to grant the Russian language the status of an official language on a par with Ukrainian, to establish a moratorium on price increases and reduce the level of social payments, to create a municipal police force and recognized Russia as a strategic partner of the region. It was also recommended to the Donetsk Regional Council together with the Luhansk Regional Council to create a commission for the formation of the stabilization fund of Donbas.

On March 3, pro-Russian demonstrators seized part of the building of the Donetsk Regional State Administration, where at a meeting of the regional council, deputies elected a new chairman of the council Andriy Shyshatsky and supported the decision to hold a referendum on the territory of the Donetsk region on the most pressing issues for residents of the region, condemning calls for the region's separation from Ukraine. About 1,000 people with Russian tricolors led by self-proclaimed Governor Pavel Gubarev, stormed the session hall of the regional council, causing a clash in the hall. Pavlo Gubarev addressed the audience: in his speech, he called himself the "people's" governor and ordered to inform representatives of the Russian media that the regional state administration in his person does not accept the central government in Kyiv. In addition, the self-proclaimed governor said that it is planned to create a "provisional government of Donbass", the creation of self-defense forces, and it was also proposed to the leadership of the Air Force, prosecutor's office and the SBU of the region to take an oath to the "people's authorities. Pro-Russian activists also blocked the institution, not allowing employees to leave it, it was also reported about three deputies who did not have time to leave the regional council, they were forced to write statements about the drafting of their deputy powers. During the seizure of the administration, unknown persons attacked the head of the regional council Andrei Shishatsky, who managed to free himself from the attackers thanks to police officers and the SBU but during other events in the administration, the internal affairs officers did not resist the activists.

On March 5, under the pretext of detecting an explosive device in the building, the police cleared the regional administration building of protesters, Ukrainian flag was again hung over the building. By 16:00, about 5,000–7,000 protesters of referendum supporters had gathered under the administration, including activists of the "People's Militia of Donbas", "Russian bloc" and activists from Russia (including the former leader of the far-right organization "Shield of Moscow" Oexiy Khudyakov). At the same time, a rally of supporters of Ukraine's unity began at Svobody Square, which gathered about 7,000–10,000 protesters. Some time after the start of the rally near the building of the regional administration, protesters led by Gubarev began to storm the building, there were clashes with soldiers of internal troops and police guarding the building. As a result of clashes with the police, the supporters of the referendum again occupied the RSA building (Regional State Administration) and hung the Russian flag over it.

After the seizure of the RSA building, pro-Russian forces split. About a few hundred of them supported Pavel Gubarev and went to seize the building of the Main Directorate of the Treasury in the Donetsk region, first mistakenly arriving at the building of the Financial Inspection, then, having reached the necessary building, they began its blockade. At the same time, another group of about 1,500 pro-Russian activists moved towards Freedom Square, where they got into a fight with rallying supporters of Ukraine. Some supporters of the referendum, about 200 people, remained in the RSA building.

The next day, March 6, at about 6:45 a.m., the police debunked the Treasury building and freed the RSA building from the protesters, while detaining 70 people, and the Ukrainian flag was returned to the RSA building. At the same time, the Security Service of Ukraine arrested Pavel Gubarev. In the evening of this day, about 200 supporters of Gubarev picketed the building of the Main Directorate of the SBU in the Donetsk region demanding the release of their leader.

On March 13, an anti-war rally for Ukraine's unity was attacked by pro-Russian activists. Law enforcement officers and maidan self-defense tried to protect the departure of the participants of the action, which allowed most of them to leave Lenin Square. After the retreat of the main group of supporters of the integrity of Ukraine, police officers hid members of self-defense in their bus, who surrounded the supporters of the unity of Donbass with Russia, who pierced the wheels, smashed windows and threw firecrackers at the cars, spraying tear gas. The police managed to detain several attackers, but under pressure from the crowd they were released. According to official information, one person died from stab wounds during the fight, 10 people were hospitalized in particular, three were taken to the neurosurgical department  the M. Kalinin Hospital. According to media reports, the death toll is 2–3 persons, the number of injured is at least 50 people.

On March 19, the Security Service of Ukraine arrested Andrei Purgin, the leader of the Donetsk Republic, who took part in the assaults on the RSA building on March 3 and 5..

April 2014 
On April 5, a rally of supporters of federalization and accession to Russia was held. About 1,000 people gathered for the rally led by Denis Pushilin, who called himself deputy "people's governor" Pavel Gubarev.

On April 6, about 2,000 pro-Russian protesters gathered in Lenin Square. After the end of the rally, the protesters marched along Artema Street to the building of the Donetsk Regional State Administration. Protesters began to storm the building, there were clashes with the police, who guarded it. After two groups of separatists managed to enter the courtyard and the building itself, and a grenade was thrown outside the window of the building, the security forces retreated, the building was again under the control of the separatists, the flags of Russia and the "DPR" were hung over the administration. After the seizure of the Regional State Administration, the protesters published a resolution demanding the immediate convening of an extraordinary session of the Donetsk Regional Council and its decision to hold a referendum on joining Russia.

On April 7, 2014, in the session hall of the Donetsk Regional State Administration, separatists proclaimed a "declaration of sovereignty of the Donetsk People's Republic", which was proclaimed on the territory of the Donetsk region. On April 10, supporters of the Donetsk People's Republic announced a referendum and began the formation of an "election commission".

According to Lesya Orobets dated April 14, 2014, in Donetsk, the majority of policemen betrayed Ukraine.

On April 16, separatists seized the city hall building.

On April 17, a patriotic rally was held in Donetsk, where about three thousand people gathered. The protesters held a large yellow-blue Ukrainian flag, Oleg Lyashko took part also. Donetsk Regional State Administration, meanwhile, remains under the control of the invaders. On April 25, Ukrainian flags could be seen at a rally in memory of the victims of the Chornobyl tragedy.

On April 28, the last patriotic rally in Donetsk to date took place. The marchers for a united Ukraine were attacked by people in camouflage and with bats. As a result, 15 people were seriously injured, 5 people are missing. Despite the fact that the aggression of separatist gangs was predictable, the Donetsk police remained idle.

May 2014 
The "referendum" designed to legitimize the so-called DPR was held on May 11, 2014, and its result, according to the announcement of the initiators, 89.07 percent of voters voted for the proclamation of the Donetsk People's Republic.

The official report on the human rights situation in Ukraine of the Office of the UN High Commissioner for Human Rights states that on May 15, the UOC-KP condemned violence and threats to the life and health of the clergy and believers of Eastern Ukraine from armed groups, and also states that numerous attacks on the interreligious prayer marathon are taking place in Donetsk (with the participation of all major denominations, except for the Moscow Patriarchate), including severe beatings of participants, destruction of property and threats. Reports of attacks have also come from other denominations, such as those from Protestants.

On May 23, after another attack by 15 DPR representatives, organizers and volunteers went to the building of the Donetsk Regional State Administration in an attempt to discuss security measures. The coordinator of the prayer marathon Sergiy Kosyak was badly beaten and had to seek medical help.

Capture of objects in the city 
Starting from April 6, the separatists began seizing administrative buildings, strongholds of law enforcement agencies, and later other economic and infrastructure facilities.

On April 6, the separatists seized the regional state administration, cutting Ukrainian flag from the flagpole.

On April 27, the building of the Regional State Television and Radio Company (ODTRK) was seized.

On May 4, the separatists seized the premises of the military prosecutor's office

On May 16, the separatists seized the headquarters of the Eastern Operational and Territorial Association of the National Guard of Ukraine in the city of Donetsk, and the personnel were relocated.

Beginning in June 2014, the separatists began seizing bank branches, causing disruptions to the banking system.

On June 16, the separatists seized the Treasury and the NBU office in response, the NBU disabled the payment and settlement system in the Donetsk region and moved the Accounting Chamber, 11 banks, 10 branches and 1,576 branches from Donetsk.

On July 6, due to militant attacks, they were forced to stop the work of the PrivatBank and Nova Poshta.

On July 10, the Kirova Palace of Culture was seized

On November 24, the militants seized the premises of Pivdenkombank in Donetsk.

On November 26, militants seized the buildings of the Chamber of Commerce and Industry, the regional employment center and the Pension Fund.

On November 30, militants seized a branch of Oschadbank in four districts of the city.

Fighting in the city 
The hottest point in the city and at the same time, one of the hottest points of the entire Donbass was the Donetsk airport. Fighting for this facility between Ukrainian soldiers and pro-Russian separatists lasted from May 26, 2014, to January 21, 2015, when the separatists made repeated attempts to forcibly seize the facility. In the night from May 26 to May 27, the Ukrainian military managed to recapture the Donetsk airport, but the separatists did not abandon attempts to recapture the object, as a result of which its functioning for its intended purpose ceased. As a result of constant shelling of the airport building during the summer-autumn of 2014, they were almost completely destroyed. Ukrainian soldiers held the defense of the airport for 242 days, which is only a week less than the duration of the defense of Sevastopol in 1941.

At the same time, there is evidence of fighting between individual groups of separatists that have erupted from time to time.

Destruction of infrastructure and death of civilians 
As a result of constant hostilities in Donetsk, infrastructure, including residential areas and enterprises have destroyed. As of January 22, 2015, the infrastructure damages in the ATO zone included 866 damaged objects, 103 of which were completely destroyed, including the Zhovtnevyi and Sokol markets.

Shelling often leads to the death of local residents. The largest number of victims was inflicted by mortar shelling of a public transport stop, committed on January 22, 2015, in which 13 people were killed. Both sides of the conflict accused each other of responsibility for the attack.

On February 8, 2015, at 22:45, a powerful explosion occurred at the Donetsk State Chemical Products Plant in Kuibyshev Raion.

See also 
 Outline of the Russo-Ukrainian War

References 

War in Donbas
History of Donetsk
2014 in Ukraine
Battles of the war in Donbas